Durusdinium is a genus of dinoflagellate algae within the family Symbiodiniaceae. Durusdinium can be free living, or can form symbiotic associations with hard corals. Members of the genus have been documented in reef-building corals of the Indian and Pacific oceans, as well as the Caribbean. Prior to 2018, Durusdinium were classified as Symbiodinium Clade D.

Species
Durusdinium trenchii

References

Dinophyceae
Dinoflagellate genera